Sandra J. "Sandy" Lenz-Jackson (born June 10, 1960 in Rockford, Illinois) is an American former figure skater. She won the bronze medal at the 1980 U.S. Figure Skating Championships and competed at that year's Winter Olympics. She was also the 1977 U.S. junior champion.

Lenz was not selected to compete at the 1980 World Championships, but she continued to compete and won the St. Ivel International in England in the fall of 1980. She then retired in 1981 due to injuries. She was coached by Evy and Mary Scotvold.

Lenz has worked as a skating coach. In August 2015, she won the silver medal at the inaugural World Figure Championships (losing the title on a tie-break).

Results

References

American female single skaters
Olympic figure skaters of the United States
Figure skaters at the 1980 Winter Olympics
Living people
1960 births
Place of birth missing (living people)
21st-century American women